Ten Boer is a village and a former municipality in the northeastern Netherlands, in the province of Groningen. In 2019, it was merged into municipality of Groningen.

History 
The village was first mentioned in 1301 as "conventum de Bure", and means "near the house". Ten Boer is a terp (artificial living hill) village on a grid structure. In 1301, a Benedictine monastery for nuns was established in Ten Boer. In 1485, it was incorporated into the monastery of Thesinge.

The Dutch Reformed church is the former monastery church, and dates from the 13th century. The church was modified in 1565. The tower was demolished around 1800, and in 1810, a ridge turret was placed on the roof instead.

Ten Boer was home to 279 people in 1840. The former town hall is an L-shaped building with tower from 1911. It was influenced by Berlage and Jugendstil. Ten Boer was an independent municipality until 2019 when it was merged into Groningen.

Former population centres 
Garmerwolde, Lellens, Sint Annen, Ten Boer, Ten Post, Thesinge, Winneweer, Wittewierum and Woltersum.

Notable people from Ten Boer
 Dirk van der Borg (born 1955), mayor of Graafstroom and Molenwaard
 Paul Drewes (born 1982), Olympic rower
 Hendrik Nienhuis (1790-1862), jurist and parliament member
 Remco van der Schaaf (born 1979), football player

Gallery

References

External links

Groningen (city)
Former municipalities of Groningen (province)
Populated places in Groningen (province)
Municipalities of the Netherlands disestablished in 2019